Lulworth is a rural residential locality in the local government area of George Town in the Launceston region of Tasmania. The 2016 census determined a population of 165 for the state suburb of Lulworth.

History
Lulworth was gazetted as a locality in 1964.

Geography
Bass Strait forms the northern boundary.

Road infrastructure
The C817 route (Tam O’Shanter Road) enters from the south-east and runs through to the village in the north-west, where it ends.

References

Localities of George Town Council
Towns in Tasmania